Cyrus is a ghost town in Wilcox Township, Trego County, Kansas, United States.

History
Cyrus was issued a post office in 1880. The post office was discontinued in 1889.

References

Former populated places in Trego County, Kansas
Former populated places in Kansas